The following highways are numbered 819:

United States